All the Things I Never Said (stylized in all lowercase) is the debut extended play by Canadian singer Tate McRae. It was released on January 24, 2020 by RCA Records. The EP was preceded by three singles, and received positive reviews from critics.

Background
After she released the five-track EP on January 24, 2020, she announced her first headlining tour of Europe and North America. Each stop on the tour was sold out. The lead single, "Tear Myself Apart", was co-written by Billie Eilish and Finneas O'Connell, and together with "All My Friends Are Fake" has amassed over 10 million streams online. The final single, "Stupid" clocked 4 million Spotify streams in December 2019, and charted in Ireland and Canada, earning significant radio airplay performance in the latter. The EP has since been streamed over 400 million times as of November 2021. Each song on the EP is also stylized in lowercase.

Singles
"Tear Myself Apart" was released as the lead single from the EP on August 27, 2019. "All My Friends Are Fake" was released as the second single from the EP on October 18, 2019. "Stupid" was released as the third single from the EP on December 6, 2019. The song peaked at number 60 on the Canadian Hot 100. In 2021, "Stupid" was certified Platinum in Canada and Gold in the US, and EP track "That Way" was certified Gold in the US and Canada, and Silver in the UK.

Track listing

Notes
 "Stupid" interpolates "I'm a Mess", as performed by Bebe Rexha and written by Rexha, Justin Tranter and Jussi Karvinen. "I'm a Mess" contains an interpolation of the 1997 song "Bitch", performed by Meredith Brooks.

Charts

Certifications

References

2019 debut EPs
Tate McRae albums
RCA Records EPs